The 1971–72 season of the European Cup Winners' Cup football club tournament was won by Rangers, who defeated Dynamo Moscow in the final.

Preliminary round

|}

First leg

Second leg

4–4 on aggregate; Austria Wien won on away goals.

Hibernians won 3–2 on aggregate.

First round

|}

First leg

Second leg

Barcelona won 7–1 on aggregate.

Steaua București won 1–0 on aggregate.

Liverpool won 3–2 on aggregate.

Bayern Munich won 7–1 on aggregate.

Torino won 5–0 on aggregate.

Austria Wien won 2–1 on aggregate.

Rangers won 2–1 on aggregate.

Sporting CP won 7–0 on aggregate.

Åtvidaberg won 5–4 on aggregate.

Chelsea won 21–0 on aggregate.

Beerschot won 8–0 on aggregate.

2–2 on aggregate; BFC Dynamo won 5–4 on penalties.

Sparta won 3–1 on aggregate.

Red Star Belgrade won 8–4 on aggregate.

Eskişehirspor won 4–0 on aggregate.

Dynamo Moscow won 3–2 on aggregate.

Second round

|}

1The second leg was originally 3–2 to Sporting after 90 minutes, and 4–3 to Sporting after extra time. The referee erroneously ordered a penalty shoot-out which Sporting won 3–0; UEFA later ruled that Rangers had won on away goals.

First leg

Second leg

Steaua București won 3–1 on aggregate.

Torino won 1–0 on aggregate.

6–6 on aggregate; Rangers won on away goals.

BFC Dynamo won 6−2 on aggregate.

Quarter-finals

|}

First leg

Second leg

1–1 on aggregate; Bayern Munich won on away goals.

Rangers won 2–1 on aggregate.

BFC Dynamo won 4−2 on aggregate.

Semi-finals

|}

First leg

Second leg

Rangers won 3–1 on aggregate.

2–2 on aggregate; Dynamo Moscow won 4–1 on penalties.

Final

References

External links
 1971-72 competition at UEFA website
 Cup Winners' Cup results at Rec.Sport.Soccer Statistics Foundation
 Cup Winners Cup Seasons 1971-72–results, protocols
 website Football Archive 1971–72 Cup Winners Cup

 
3
UEFA Cup Winners' Cup seasons